An off-peak day return ticket is the name given to a cheap day return railway ticket (a substantially reduced two-way fare for off-peak travel) after pricing by time of travel was introduced on the British railway network in the 1960s.

In the United Kingdom, a cheap day return ticket is a reduced fare charged to passengers who make their outward and return trips on the same day, usually within specified hours of the day that do not coincide with peak travel periods, such as rush hour.  On British Rail services, a cheap day return was valid for off-peak services, meaning, for instance, that London-bound trains which arrived in the capital after 10am were the earliest morning trains available to passengers holding a cheap day return ticket.

This type of ticket was often also sold on days with special events, such as football matches or horse races.

References

Passenger rail transport in the United Kingdom